is a Japanese footballer who plays for Renofa Yamaguchi FC.

Club statistics
Updated to 19 July 2022.

References

External links
Profile at Renofa Yamaguchi
Profile at Tochigi SC

1993 births
Living people
National Institute of Fitness and Sports in Kanoya alumni
Association football people from Kagoshima Prefecture
Japanese footballers
J2 League players
J3 League players
Tochigi SC players
Renofa Yamaguchi FC players
Association football goalkeepers